Eudora is an unincorporated community in southwestern Polk County, Missouri, United States. It is located just east of the intersection of Route 123 and Route 215, approximately twenty miles northwest of Springfield. Aldrich on the east prong of Stockton Lake is about four miles to the north on Route 123.

References

Unincorporated communities in Polk County, Missouri
Springfield metropolitan area, Missouri
Unincorporated communities in Missouri